Marigny is a commune in the Jura department in Bourgogne-Franche-Comté in eastern France.

Population

World heritage site
It is home to one or more prehistoric pile-dwelling (or stilt house) settlements that are part of the Prehistoric Pile dwellings around the Alps UNESCO World Heritage Site.

See also
Communes of the Jura department

References

Communes of Jura (department)